Hattin is an alternative transliteration for Hittin, a Palestinian village. Hattin may also refer to:

Battle of Hattin in 1187, in which Saladin conquered most of Palestine from the Crusaders
Horns of Hattin, an extinct volcano with twin peaks overlooking the plains of Hattin
Heather Hattin (born 1961), a Canadian rower
Donald E. Hattin (1928-2016), an American geologist and geology professor
Kurn Hattin Homes for Children, a non-profit located in Westminster, Vermont

See also
Hatting (disambiguation)
Hatton (disambiguation)